Daours is a railway station serving the French towns of Daours and Aubigny in the Somme department. It is situated on the Paris–Lille railway. The station is served by local TER Hauts-de-France services between Albert, Amiens and Abbeville.

References

Daours